Thomas Edward Barwick (30 November 1907 – 26 December 1939) was an Australian rules footballer who played with Hawthorn in the Victorian Football League (VFL). He was killed in a road accident near Sea Lake at the age of 32.

Notes

External links 

1907 births
1939 deaths
Australian rules footballers from Victoria (Australia)
Hawthorn Football Club players
South Ballarat Football Club players
Road incident deaths in Victoria (Australia)